Kantheesangal or Qadishangal are the two of the many common Malayalam (and its English) renderings of a Syriac term meaning 'the holy ones'.

In the Orthodox churches of Kerala, the term applies to Mar Sabor and Mar Aphroth, while in the Roman Catholic churches of Kerala it refers to St. Gervase and his twin brother St. Protase.

Kantheesangal and St. Thomas Christians 

In c. AD 825 two Syrian Bishops, Mar Sabor and Mar Aphroth arrived in Kerala. These two saintly bishops established many churches, which were later consecrated after these two bishops - Kantheesangal. Later, during the Synod of Diamper, these churches were reconsecrated either to all saints or to Sts. Gervasius and Protasius, based on the Roman Catholic Portuguese presumption that these two Syrian bishops and all Syrian churches were heretic.

See also
Gervasius and Protasius
Mar Sabor and Mar Proth

External links
 The Kantheesangal church where the synd of Diamper was held.
 Qadishangal church at Akaparambu.
 St's. Gervasis & Prothasis church Kothanalloor.

Syrian bishops
Syriac Orthodox Church saints
Twin people
Christian clergy from Kerala